Forpadydeplasterer (foaled 10 May 2002) is a Thoroughbred racehorse. In 2008 he won the Deloitte Novice Hurdle and the following year won the Arkle Challenge Trophy at the Cheltenham Festival. He also finished second to Big Zeb in the 2010 Queen Mother Champion Chase. Forpadydeplasterer ran in the 2013 Grand National, ridden by Andrew McNamara, but did not complete the course.

References

2002 racehorse births
Racehorses bred in Ireland
Racehorses trained in Ireland
National Hunt racehorses
Thoroughbred family 23-a